Beatrice of Bohemia (1225–1290) was a daughter of King Wenceslaus I of Bohemia and his wife Kunigunde of Hohenstaufen.

She married Margrave Otto III and was the mother of:
 John III "of Prague" (1244-1268)
 Otto V "the Tall" (-1298)
 Albert III (-1300)
 Otto VI "the Short" (-1303)
 Kunigunde (died ), married:
 in 1264 to Duke Bela of Slavonia (1245-1269)
 in 1273 to Duke Waleran IV of Limburg
 Matilda (d. 1316), married in 1266 to Duke Barnim I of Pomerania (-1278)

Ancestry

References

Margravines of Brandenburg
Bavarian nobility
1225 births
1290 deaths
13th-century German nobility
Přemyslid dynasty
People of medieval Bavaria
13th-century German women
Women of medieval Bavaria
Daughters of kings